Jim Lang (born October 7, 1965 in Verdun, France) is a Canadian sportscaster, formerly with Rogers Sportsnet and Sportsnet Radio Fan 590 in Toronto. During his Sportsnet tenure, Lang co-hosted the weekend edition of Sportsnet Connected alongside Evanka Osmak.

In 2002, Lang served as the radio voice of the Toronto Argonauts of the Canadian Football League on Mojo Radio AM 640.

From March 10, 2011 to September 2013, Lang served as morning show co-host on Sportsnet Radio Fan 590 alongside Greg Brady.

Since February 2014, Lang has served as the host of his morning show, "The Jim Lang Show", on CFMS-FM alongside co-host Martha O'Neill.

References

External links
JimLang.ca
Sportsnet.ca blogs
 

1965 births
Canadian bloggers
Canadian Football League announcers
Canadian radio sportscasters
Canadian sports talk radio hosts
Canadian television sportscasters
Living people
People from Toronto
People from Verdun
Toronto Argonauts personnel
People from Simcoe County